The Dothan Eagle is a daily newspaper serving Dothan, Alabama, and surrounding communities.

History
It was founded in 1908. It was owned by the Thomson Corporation until 2000, when it was sold to Media General. In 2012, Media General sold most of its newspapers, including the Eagle, to Berkshire Hathaway. In 2020, the Eagle and all Berkshire Hathaway newspapers were acquired by Lee Enterprises.

Awards

2018 Better Newspaper Contest - Alabama Press Association

References

External links
 
 
 

1908 establishments in Alabama
Daily newspapers published in the United States
Companies based in Dothan, Alabama
Lee Enterprises publications
Newspapers published in Alabama
Publications established in 1908